PA17 may refer to:
Pennsylvania Route 17
Pennsylvania's 17th congressional district
Piper PA-17 Vagabond light aircraft